The Gay Parisian is an American short film produced in 1941 by Warner Bros. and directed by Jean Negulesco. The film is a screen adaptation, in Technicolor, of the 1938 ballet Gaîté Parisienne, choreographed by Léonide Massine to music by Jacques Offenbach. It was nominated for an Academy Award at the 14th Academy Awards for Best Short Subject (Two-Reel).

Cast
 Ballet Russe de Monte-Carlo as Dancers
 Léonide Massine as The Peruvian (as Leonide Massine)
 Milada Mladova as The Glove Seller
 Frederic Franklin as The Baron
 Nathalie Krassovska as The Flower Girl
 Andre Eglevsky as Tortoni - The Dancing Master
 Igor Youskevitch as Officer
 Lubov Roudenko as Can-Can Dancer
 Casimir Kokitch as Dancer
 James Starbuck as Dancer

References

External links
 

1941 films
1941 romance films
1941 short films
American romance films
American short films
Films directed by Jean Negulesco
1940s English-language films
1940s American films